The Three Wise Men are a row of three seamounts (underwater volcanoes) located in the Pacific Ocean, on the East Pacific Rise. They are part of a large group of seamounts, collectively known as the Rano Rahi. The middle of the three is the tallest and also the flattest at its top. The southern one is similar to its larger neighbor, but slightly shorter. The northern one is the middle of the two, with a large caldera and a circular shape.

References

Seamounts of the Pacific Ocean